Satghara, is a town and union council of Okara District in the Punjab province of Pakistan.
It is located at 30°55'0N 73°31'0E with an altitude of 164 metres (541 feet)  and is also the location of the tomb of Baloch folk hero, Mir Chakar Rind.  Many of his descendants as well as sub tribes of Baloch descent predominate in the district.

Mounds of brick debris at Satghara mark the site of a forgotten town, the coins found at Satghara prove that it was inhabited in the time of the Kushan dynasty.

The name of this town "Satghara" is commonly believed to drive its name from words (Saat or Seven) (Ghara or pitchers) or (ghars or homes). Another sound historical folklore is narrated that some injured soldiers of Alexandar the Great (belonging to ancient town of Stageira of Macedonia) resided their and they named this ancient town as Stageira now corrupted as Satghara.

More than half of the town is inhabited by Syeds. They also have a family graveyard where many great spiritual leaders including Syed Qaim Ali Shah Gilani, who was also known as Pir Bodian Wala and was head of this lineage of the descendants of Abdul Qadir Gilani (Ghouse Al Azam) of Baghdad Sharif in Satghara, his eldest son Syed Ahmed Shah Gilani who was lately known as Pir Bodian Wala, Syed Shams-Ud-Din Gilani, Syed Fateh Ali Shah Gilani, Syed Mubarik Ali Shah Gilani, Syed Ahmed Ali Shah Gilani (Chan Peer), Syed Jaffar Hussain Gilani, Syed Ali Bahadur Gilani, Syed Sher Shah Gilani, Syed Khadim Hussain Gilani (Peer Sahib) and his son Syed Abid Raza Gilani are lying in peace. Their shrines are built in the graveyard and are visible even from a great distance.

References

Union councils of Okara District